Hoth is a fictional planet in the Star Wars universe.

Hoth may also refer to:

Höðr or Hoth, a god in Norse mythology
Hoth, a fictional planet in the novel Space Viking by H. Beam Piper

Places
Harrow-on-the-Hill station on London's Metropolitan line
OGLE-2005-BLG-390Lb, a super-Earth exoplanet

People with the surname
Hermann Hoth (1885–1971), German panzer commander in World War II
Frank Schwalba-Hoth (born 1952), German former politician

Other uses
 Hoth Inc., a North American airline holding company
Houses of the Holy, the 1973 album by Led Zeppelin

See also